Doctor Coss is both a city and a municipality in Nuevo León, Mexico. Its name honors Dr. José María Coss, a liberal politician of the 19th century. In 2000 the municipality had 2246 inhabitants, while the homonym city (which serves as the municipal seat) had some 1,000.

The first settlement, Paso del Zacate, was formed around 1745 with families from Los Aldamas, Nuevo León and General Bravo. Almost a century later Paso del Zacate was declared a villa by the state congress and finally, on October 7, 1882, the municipality of Doctor Coss was formed with the unification of Paso del Zacate, Zacate, Soledad, El Ebanito, La Lajilla, Los Chorros, Tecomate, Lucero, Las Mujeres and Gachupines.

The municipality has an area of 664.6 km² and is bordered by the state of Tamaulipas to the north, General Bravo to the east and Los Aldama and China to the west. It is located 134 meters above sea level (which makes it the highest municipality in the state) and is crossed by the San Juan river. 

Doctor Coss has 4 kindergartens, 14 elementary schools and one secondary school.

List of mayors in Dr. Coss

External links
(es) Enciclopedia de los Municipios de México: Doctor Coss.
(es) INEGI: Municipalities of Nuevo León.

Populated places in Nuevo León
Municipalities of Nuevo León